Bridle Trails State Park is a  state park in the Bridle Trails neighborhood in an unincorporated part of the Eastside area of King County, Washington. Established in 1932 and developed in 1933 by the Civil Works Administration, primary features of the park include a forested trail system shared by pedestrians and equestrians and an outdoor arena used for equestrian purposes.

Description
Just outside the city of Redmond, Bridle Trails State Park is a state park that borders the Eastside cities of Kirkland to the north and west and Bellevue to the south and east. It is bounded by 116th Avenue NE and I-405 to the west, NE 60th Street to the north, 132nd Avenue NE to the east, and suburban housing to the south. The primary entry point to the park is off of 116th Avenue NE, where a parking lot for Discover Pass holders allows access to the park's trailhead for drivers.

The park offers an unpaved  trail system for horseback riding and hiking through thick forests, contrasting the suburban setting immediately surrounding the park and the dense urban setting of nearby Downtown Bellevue. The main pathways of Bridle Trails include the  Coyote Trail that forms a loop around the park, the  Raven Trail, and the  Trillium Trail. The  Bridle Crest Trail provides bicycle and pedestrian access between the park and Marymoor Park, the trailhead for the Sammamish River Trail in Redmond. This connection to Marymoor Park links Bridle Trails State Park to other parks included in the Mountains to Sound Greenway. Four outdoor arenas are used for equestrian shows.

Restrictions
Cycling, camping, and off-leash dogs are not permitted within the park. Pedestrians are required to yield just off of the trail to passing equestrian traffic. The park is closed after dusk and opens at 6:30 a.m. most of the year. During the winter, most of the park opens at 8:00 a.m., but some areas close entirely for the season.

History
Much of the land included in the park was set aside "for the purpose of being applied to common schools" when Washington Territory was created in 1853. That land became a state park in 1932 after efforts of local advocates. Workers with the Civil Works Administration cleared brush, burned logging debris, built trails and fences, and other efforts in initial park development. The Bridle Trails Park Foundation was established in 2002 to pay half the cost of park operations after funding from the state was reduced.

Originally the park was surrounded by properties dedicated to the ownership of horses, but successive waves of redevelopment have decreased the number of horse owners who live nearby and increased the density of residential housing. The change in the makeup of the surrounding community has created some conflict between pedestrians, particularly those accompanied by off-leash dogs, and horse riders within the park, including a 2015 incident in which a spooked horse ran from the trail and was struck by a motor vehicle, resulting in the animal's euthanization.

See also
 List of Washington state parks
 Saint Edward State Park
 Lake Sammamish State Park

References

External links

Bridle Trails Park Foundation
Bridle Trails State Park Map Bridle Trails Park Foundation
Bridle Trails State Park Washington State Parks and Recreation Commission

State parks of Washington (state)
Parks in Bellevue, Washington
Parks in Kirkland, Washington
Horse trails
Parks in King County, Washington
New Deal in Washington (state)
Protected areas established in 1932
Civil Works Administration